Agastihal  is a small village in the southern state of Karnataka, India. Administratively Agastihal is under Tewar Wadgera panchayat village, Shahapur taluka of Yadgir district in Karnataka. Agastihal is 2.7 km by road southwest of Gundgurthi, and 7 km by road northeast of Hattigudur.

Demographics 
At the 2001 census, Agastihal had 163 inhabitants, with 81 males and 82 females.

See also
 Yadgir

References

External links
 

Villages in Yadgir district